The House Administration Subcommittee on Elections was a subcommittee within the House Committee on House Administration, created for the 110th Congress, along with the Subcommittee on Capitol Security, at the urging of then Chairwoman Rep. Juanita Millender-McDonald. While active during the 111th Congress, the subcommittee became moribund in the 112th, holding only four hearings, the last in November 2011. (In contrast Ranking Member Charlie Gonzalez organized minority party-led congressional fora on campaign finance and voting rights.)

In 2013, the committee, then under Republican control, abolished the subcommittee. Following the 2018 elections, in which Democrats retook control of the House, Nancy Pelosi announced plans to restore the subcommittee and appoint Representative Marcia Fudge as chair.

Jurisdiction
From the House Rules:

The Subcommittee on Elections handles Federal election-related issues. One of the major functions of the subcommittee is its oversight of the Federal Elections Commission (FEC) and the Elections Assistance Commission (EAC). The subcommittee’s jurisdiction also extends to the Help America Vote Act (HAVA), the Federal Election Campaign Act, the Bipartisan Campaign Reform Act, and the Uniformed and Overseas Citizens Absentee Voting Act (UOCAVA).

In addition to these policy areas the Subcommittee on Elections is also responsible for contested elections under the Federal Contested Elections Act.

Members, 117th Congress

Historical membership rosters

116th Congress

112th Congress

References

External links
Official site

Administration Elections